The men's triple jump event at the 2017 European Athletics Indoor Championships was held on 3 March 2015 at 18:20 (qualification) and 5 March, 16:04 (final) local time.

Medalists

Records

Results

Qualification 
Qualification: Qualifying performance 16.60 (Q) or at least 8 best performers (q) advance to the Final.

Final

References 

2017 European Athletics Indoor Championships
Triple jump at the European Athletics Indoor Championships